Südberlin Maskulin is a collabo album by German rappers Fler (alias Frank White) and Godsilla.

Track listing 

Additional the Downstairs Edition features a 35 minute long DVD.

References

External links 
http://www.laut.de/lautstark/cd-reviews/f/frank_white_godsilla/suedberlin_maskulin/index.htm

Fler albums
German-language albums